A Spice Girl is a member of English girl group the Spice Girls.

Spice Girl may also refer to:

 "Spice Girl", a song by rapper Aminé on the album Good for You
 Spice Girl, a character in JoJo's Bizarre Adventure
 "Spice Girl", an episode of JoJo's Bizarre Adventure: Golden Wind